The 2015 SEABA Under-16 Championship was the qualifying tournament for Southeast Asia Basketball Association at the 2015 FIBA Asia Under-16 Championship. The tournament was held in Cagayan de Oro, Philippines from April 14 to April 19.

Xavier University was the venue for the games participated by the national teams of Brunei, Indonesia, Malaysia, Thailand, and the host country. The top three teams, excluding Indonesia, will represent SEABA at the 2015 FIBA Asia Under-16 Championship to be held in Semarang, Indonesia. The tournament followed a single round robin format.

The Philippines won their third straight title after winning all of their games in the tournament. Malaysia placed second, and Thailand, despite placing fourth, qualified to represent SEABA by virtue of Indonesia's host status of the Asian tournament.

Venue

Results

Final standings

Awards

Sponsorship
The tournament was sponsored by the MVP Sports Foundation, Smart Communications, Maynilad, Rio Verde Water Cagayan de Oro and Rough Rider Jeans Clothing with the Department of Tourism Promotions Board, led by Domingo Ramon Enerio III.

References

External links
Schedule for 2015 3rd SEABA U16 Championship

2015
International basketball competitions hosted by the Philippines
2014–15 in Asian basketball
2014–15 in Philippine basketball
Sports in Misamis Oriental